Vladyslav Klymenko (born 19 June 1994) is a Ukrainian professional footballer who plays as a defender for Inhulets Petrove.

He is a product of Odesa sports school DYuSSh–11. Klymenko made his debut at senior level for FC Real Pharma Yuzhne in the Ukrainian Second League in 2011. In 2012 he joined the Ukrainian Premier League club FC Kryvbas Kryvyi Rih, where he played in the youth team in the UPL youth league. Klymenko joined FC Inhulets Petrove during winter of 2016–17 after leaving Skala Stryi.

References

External links
 
 
 

1994 births
Living people
Footballers from Odesa
Ukrainian footballers
Association football defenders
FC Real Pharma Odesa players
FC Inhulets Petrove players
FC Skala Stryi (2004) players
FC Chornomorets Odesa players
FC Mariupol players
Ukrainian Premier League players
Ukrainian First League players
Ukrainian Second League players